Julie Rocheleau (born 1982) is a Canadian animation designer, graphic novel artist and illustrator living in Montreal, Quebec.

From 1999 to 2002, she studied at the Cégep du Vieux Montréal. Her short animation Griselda won second prize in a category for promising students in a competition sponsored by Teletoon. From 2002 to 2011, she worked for different animation studios in character design and storyboarding. During the same period, she illustrated books for children and young adults and designed notices for various cultural events. In 2011, Rocheleau also received a Joe Shuster Award for outstanding colourist; she was also nominated in the outstanding artist category. The first book in the series La colère de Fantômas, with writer  received an award in the graphic novel category at the Festival Interpol'art at Reims. In 2014, the first book of La Colère de Fantomas earned her a Joe Shuster Award for outstanding cover artist.

Selected work 
 Tommy l’enfant-loup (2015), illustrator, text by Samuel Archibald
 Deuxième étage de l’océan (2015), illustrator, text by Carle Coppens
 La petite patrie, graphic novel (2015), with writer Normand Grégoire
 About Betty's Boob (2018), with Vero Cazot, published by Archaia Entertainment

References

External links 
 

1982 births
Living people
Canadian children's book illustrators
Canadian comics artists
Canadian comics writers
Canadian animated film directors
Artists from Montreal
Film directors from Montreal
Writers from Montreal
Canadian graphic novelists
Canadian female comics artists
Female comics writers
Canadian women animators